Chromium(III) nicotinate is an ionic substance used for chromium supplementation in some nutritional products, where it is also referred to as chromium polynicotinate. It appears in products that are referred to as a medical food used for nutritional support for conditions associated with diabetes mellitus type 2.  The product is also known as "niacin-bound chromium".

Chemistry
Chromium(III) nicotinate contains three nicotinic acid units per chromium ion; that is, it is the trinicotinate of chromium(III). The substance that is used in supplements and called "chromium polynicotinate" is said to be a mixture of the trinicotinate and the dinicotinate, with the former dominating.

See also 
 Chromium(III) picolinate

References 

Chromium(III) compounds
Nicotinates
Dietary supplements
Medical food
3-Pyridyl compounds